Writtle University College is a university college located in Writtle near Chelmsford, Essex. It was founded in 1893. Writtle obtained University College status in May 2016. 

Its countryside estate features a wide range of facilities, including a working farm, an equine centre, science laboratories, design studios, a canine therapy clinic, a specialist animal unit and sports provision including the UK's first permanent 3x3 basketball courts.

Overview 

The university college teaches undergraduate and postgraduate degrees in subjects including: 

 Art
 Agriculture
 Animal Science
 Animal Management
 Canine Therapy
 Equine 
 Horticulture 
 Sport & Exercise Science
 Veterinary Physiotherapy

Further education courses include:

 Apprenticeships
 Agriculture
 Animal Studies
 Conservation (Land and Wildlife)
 Equine
 Floristry
 Horticulture (Gardening and Landscaping)
 Sport

Dr. Stephen Waite was appointed as the new Principal in Spring 2013 and changed his job title to Vice-Chancellor upon the college obtaining University status. He retired in August 2017 and was succeeded by Professor Tim Middleton. 

Writtle University College was granted Taught Degree Awarding Powers (TDAP) by the Privy Council in March 2015.

Baroness Jenkin of Kennington became Writtle University College's Founding Chancellor in 2016. She was succeeded by farmer and television presenter Jimmy Doherty in 2022. Celebrity gardener Alan Titchmarsh previously acted at the college's patron.

History 
Established in 1893, the college was originally known as County Laboratories, teaching agriculture and horticulture and becoming the County Technical Laboratories in 1903. 

In 1912 it became East Anglian Institute of Agriculture. It changed its name to Essex Institute of Agriculture, Writtle in 1939 and moved to the Writtle Estate in 1940. 

In 1914, teaching temporarily halted following the outbreak of the First World War. 'Writtle College, The First Hundred Years' by Clive Beale and Geoff Owen, states that some staff left to join the armed forces while others were seconded to the War Agricultural Committee, which had taken over the institute. 

During the Second World War, the Institute supported the Dig For Victory Campaign with advice on crop production, gardening, plant protection and livestock. The campus was also central to work carried out by the Women's Land Army in Essex and taught short, three week training courses. 

It became Writtle Agricultural College in 1969, Writtle College in 1989 and Writtle University College in 2016.

Awards and Achievements 

 The Writtle floristry team won the Gold award at the Royal Horticultural Society Hampton Court Palace Flower Show in 2012 for their exhibition entitled "Lady of Shallot" and Silver the following year for their exhibition "Rock Around the Clock". 
 The University College's further education horticulture students won a Gold award at the Royal Horticultural Society Young Gardeners of the Year competition in 2014, having previously won Silver in 2013 and 2012 and Bronze in 2011. They then won 'Best in Show', 'Gold' and 'People's Choice' awards, presented by David Domoney, at the Ideal Home Show Young Gardeners of the Year competition in 2015.
 In 2019, Writtle University College was named the British Florist Association's 'Floristry Training Provider of the Year' and University College lecturer Elaine Thackray was awarded the title 'Floristry Tutor of the Year'.
 Writtle University College received one of England's highest student satisfaction ratings in the 2020 National Student Survey, when 92% of participating students agreed with the statement: "overall, I am satisfied with the quality of the course”.

In 2021, members of the student-run Gaia Club launched a campaign to plant over 700 new trees on Writtle University College's countryside estate.

Northumberland Building Light Well Mosaic
In 2006 British artist Anne Schwegmann-Fielding installed a mosaic sculpture in the light well of the Northumberland Building foyer. Based on an aerial photograph of the college, the installation was the culmination of a 2005 Leverhulme Trust grant titled 'The Landscape of Mosaic' which also saw the development of a mosaic meadow which combined artist's source materials and wild flowers.

See also
 Sturgeons House

References

Bibliography

External links

University of Essex
Educational institutions established in 1893
Agricultural universities and colleges in the United Kingdom
1893 establishments in England